The Belgian Bowl XVII  was played in 2004 and was won by the Antwerp Diamonds. This was the second consecutive appearance of Antwerp in the Belgian Bowl.

Playoffs
The top four teams of the regular season are seeded into playoffs for the Belgian Bowl

References

External links
Official Belgian Bowl website

American football in Belgium
Belgian Bowl
Belgian Bowl